Petruichthys is a genus of stone loaches native to eastern Asia. The genus is not universally accepted as valid and the two species placed thare have been placed in other genera.

Species
There are currently two recognized species in this genus, though one is not as yet assignable to this genus with complete certainty:
 Petruichthys brevis (Boulenger, 1893)
 Petruichthys salmonides (B. L. Chaudhuri, 1911) (species inquirenda and incertae sedis, probably in this genus)

References

Nemacheilidae